R&BW is the fourth studio album by Nigerian singer Banky W. It was released on 14 February 2013, by Empire Mates Entertainment. The album was supported by the singles "Yes/No", which peaked at number 1 on the BBC Radio 1Xtra Afrobeat chart, and "Good Good Loving". The album features guest appearances from Camp Mulla, ELDee, Sarkodie, Sammy, Shaydee, Skales, Lynxxx, Niyola, M.I, 2Face Idibia, Rotimi and Vector. Its production was handled by Banky W, Cobhams Asuquo, Masterkraft, M.I, Spellz, Sarz and Samklef.

Release and promotion
Banky W revealed the album's cover art to the public several days after signing a ₦100 million contract with Samsung West Africa. The cover art was designed by The Eclectic Source, a design company. Banky W promoted the album by holding the "Grand Love Concert" at the Civic Centre in Victoria Island.

Singles
The album's lead single "Yes/No" was released on 19 November 2012. The music video for the song was co-directed by Banky W and Clarence Peters. British-Nigerian model Angela Tokunbo Daniel made a cameo appearance in the video.

The Spellz-produced track "Good Good Loving" was released as the album's second single. The song's visuals features cameo appearances from Damilola Adegbite, Wizkid, Boj, Lynxxx, Efya, ELDee, Skales, Niyola, P.R.E, Shaydee and Masterkraft. "Good Good Loving" won Best R&B Single at The Headies 2013.

Critical reception

R&BW received generally positive reviews from music critics. A writer for TayoTV gave the album an 8.75 out of 10, concluding: "Banky made it known that he still has it and The W Experience wasn’t a fluke. This is what we want out of Nigeria not the glorified noise most of these artistes call songs or albums." A writer for the music blog Jaguda awarded the album 9 stars out of 10, noting that it doesn't "lack in originality and freshness". Chiagoziem Onyekwena of Nigerian Entertainment Today gave the album a 3.5 rating out of 5, highlighting Wizkid's absence on the record.

Accolades
R&BW was nominated for Best R&B/Pop Album and Album of the Year at the 2013 edition of The Headies.

Track listing

Personnel

Olubankole Wellington – primary artist, producer, executive producer 
Cobhams Asuquo – producer
Masterkraft – producer
Jude Abaga – producer, featured artist
Spellz – producer
Sarz – producer
Samklef – producer
Taio Tripper – featured artist
Shappa Man – featured artist
Miss Karun – featured artist
Lanre Dabiri – featured artist
Michael Owusu Addo – featured artist 
Sammy – featured artist 
Shadrach Adeboye – featured artist 
Eniola Akinbo – featured artist 
Raoul John Njeng-Njeng – featured artist 
Chukie Edozien – featured artist 
Innocent Ujah Idibia – featured artist 
Olanrewaju Ogunmefun – featured artist

References

2013 albums
Albums produced by Masterkraft (producer)
Albums produced by Samklef
Banky W. albums
Yoruba-language albums
Albums produced by Spellz
Albums produced by Sarz
Albums produced by Cobhams Asuquo